Chromosome 11 open reading frame 80 is a protein that in humans is encoded by the C11orf80 gene.

References

Further reading